Faunt is a surname. Notable people with the name include:

Arthur Faunt (1554–1591), English theologian
Jason Faunt (born 1974), American actor
Nicholas Faunt (fl. 1572–1608), English politician
William Faunt (1495/1496–1559), English politician

See also
Faunce (surname)